Live Oak is a city in Bexar County, Texas, United States. The population was 15,781 at the 2020 census. It is part of the San Antonio Metropolitan Statistical Area.

Geography

Demographics

As of the 2020 United States census, there were 15,781 people, 6,135 households, and 3,940 families residing in the city. The population density was 1,956.7 people per square mile (755.4/km). There were 3,518 housing units at an average density of 751.8 per square mile (290.2/km). Of the 6,135 households 35.4% had children under the age of 18 living with them, 59.5% were married couples living together, 12.2% had a female householder with no husband present, and 24.4% were non-families. 19.7% of households were one person and 4.3% were one person aged 65 or older. The average household size was 2.67 and the average family size was 3.06.

The age distribution was 26.3% under the age of 18, 7.4% from 18 to 24, 31.1% from 25 to 44, 26.1% from 45 to 64, and 9.1% 65 or older. The median age was 36 years. For every 100 females, there were 94.2 males. For every 100 females age 18 and over, there were 88.8 males.

The median household income was $48,184 and the median family income  was $52,885. Males had a median income of $34,786 versus $26,319 for females. The per capita income for the city was $21,467. About 5.4% of families and 7.1% of the population were below the poverty line, including 11.9% of those under age 18 and 4.8% of those age 65 or over.

Climate
The climate in this area is characterized by hot, humid summers and generally mild to cool winters.  According to the Köppen Climate Classification system, Live Oak has a humid subtropical climate, abbreviated "Cfa" on climate maps.

References

External links
 Live Oak official website

Cities in Texas
Cities in Bexar County, Texas
Greater San Antonio